Afanasovskaya is a rural locality (a village) in Troitskoye Rural Settlement, Ust-Kubinsky District, Vologda Oblast, Russia. The population was 67 as of 2002. There are 3 streets.

Geography 
Afanasovskaya is located 48 km northwest of Ustye (the district's administrative centre) by road. Lyskovskaya is the nearest rural locality.

References 

Rural localities in Ust-Kubinsky District